The  is an electric multiple unit (EMU) train type operated by the private railway operator Shin-Keisei Electric Railway on the Shin-Keisei Line in Chiba Prefecture, Japan, since 1986.

Formations
, the fleet consists of 16 six-car sets based at Kunugiyama Depot with three motored (M) cars and three trailer (T) cars, formed as shown below, with the Tc1 car at the Tsudanuma end.

 The M and M2 cars are each fitted with two lozenge-type pantographs. Sets 8804, 8808, 8812, and 8816 have single-arm pantographs.
 The T car is designated as having mild air-conditioning.

Interior

History
The trains were originally formed as eight-car sets, with the first set introduced on 26 February 1986. This was followed by four more sets in 1987, two sets in 1988, two sets in 1989, two sets in 1990, and one set in 1991.

The original eight-car sets were formed as follows. The two M2 cars were each fitted with two lozenge-type pantographs.

With Shin-Keisei's revised timetable on 10 December 2006, the 8800 series, alongside the 8000 and N800 series, began operation on Keisei Chiba Line through services. Three 8800 series sets (8801, 8841, and 8865) were rearranged to form four 6-car sets initially.

In 2013, sets 8806 and 8815 were experimentally equipped with LED headlights, but these were subsequently replaced by conventional lights. Set 8801 received LED headlights from June 2015.

Livery variations
The first set to receive Shin-Keisei's new pink corporate livery introduced in 2014 was 8816 in August 2014.

Refurbishment
A programme of refurbishment of the fleet was started in 2017, with new interior panels, flooring and seat covers. One trainset is scheduled to be treated every year.

References

External links

 Official Shin-Keisei rolling stock information 

Electric multiple units of Japan
Train-related introductions in 1986
Nippon Sharyo multiple units
1500 V DC multiple units of Japan